Saviore dell'Adamello is a comune in the province of Brescia, in Lombardy, Italy.

It is bounded by the commune of Cevo. It is located in the Val Camonica region, southwest of Mount Adamello.

References

Cities and towns in Lombardy